Mark Estdale is a British voice director, sound engineer, voice actor, and casting director. In the 1980s, he worked as a sound engineer for musicians such as The Box, UV PØP, and industrial band In The Nursery. He co-founded the electronic band Chains with Peter Hope, which in 1986 released a single on Native Records. In the 1990s, Estdale began working on video games, and is well known in the industry for founding the voice production company Outsource Media in 1996. As casting and voice director he has worked on over five hundred video games since 1995, including titles such as TimeSplitters 2, J K Rowling's Book of Spells, Clive Barker's Jericho and Wallace & Gromit's Grand Adventures.

Music career 
Estdale first started a career in music in the late 1970s. In 1984 he engineered the album Muscle In by the new wave band The Box. He also engineered Murmur by Sheffield industrial band Hula. From 1985 to 1988 he worked as either co-producer or sound engineer for a multitude of albums, including another release by The Box, two more releases by Hula, two releases by UV PØP, an album by the Lo-Fi and experimental band Toxic Shock, an album by jazz pianist John Avery, and three releases by industrial band In The Nursery.

In 1986, Estdale co-founded the electronic band Chain with Peter Hope. The band released their debut single, "Banging on the House / Chains," in February 1986 on Native Records. Estdale co-wrote and programmed both tracks, also providing drums and co-producing with Hope.

Video game career
In 1995, Estdale was hired as the voice recording engineer for the video game  Touche: The Adventures of the Fifth Musketeer for US Gold. After which he began working almost exclusively within the video games. He worked as the recording engineer for GT Racers that same year, and in 1996 directed Happy Birthday Maisy and Gloriana.

Outsource Media
In 1996, Estdale founded Outsource Media, a specialist voice production and dialogue company in Sheffield. In 1998 Estdale began serving as a voice casting director, starting with OverBlood 2, for which he was also a voice actor. That same year he was both casting and vocal director for Incoming and Extreme-G 2.

Estdale stated that the company was originally created as a lifestyle business to make sure he had time with his children, and because he found video game dialogue a creative challenge. After 2002, however, he focused on the company more intently, and it underwent significant growth. The company currently provides video game dialogue services such as scriptwriting and adaption, casting, recording, and post production. The company's stated goal is bringing the dialogue quality of film and television to video games.

In 2004, Outsource Media was nominated for the Develop Industry Excellence Award for Services and Outsourcing, and their productions were nominated for 10 BAFTA Games Awards that year alone.

Estdale opened an office in Los Angeles in 2005, after Hollywood studios such as DreamWorks Animation began approaching the company. Outsource Media now has 3 recording studios in London. In 2010, Estdale, who still serves as the company's Director and CEO, joined the company with TIGA, the trade association that represents the UK games industry.

Through his company, Estdale has worked with game publishers and developers: Microsoft, Sony, Electronic Arts, Atari, Ubisoft, LucasArts, Activision, Konami, Namco, Telltale Games, Codemasters, Climax Entertainment, Revolution Software, Relentless, Blitz Games, Rebellion Developments, Frontier Developments, and Rare.

Beliefs on video games
Estdale is a fervent proponent of professional acting and script writing in the video game industry. He is recognised for revolutionising recording for interactive media.

He is also a proponent for video games hiring professional actors that have experience with character improvisation on stage, film, or radio, as he has stated that voice-over artists are often inexperienced with acting. Estdale has espoused that another common industry problem is hiring voice actors late into the production, as they aren't given time to fully express their craftsmanship.

Estdale has also been developing software tools, known as Creative Dialogue Tools (CDT) to improve the dialogue recording and editing process for video games.

Discography
1986: Banging on the House/Chains by Chain (Native Records)

Technical
1984: Muscle In by The Box - co-producer, engineer
1984: Murmur by Hula - engineer
1985: Live: Muscle Out by The Box - live mix
1985: "Anyone For Me" on Anyone For Me EP by UV PØP - mixer, co-producer
1985: Just Another Day by Toxic Shock - engineer
1985: Nighthawks by John Avery - engineer
1985: Walk on Stalks of Shattered Glass by Hula - engineer
1986: Serious by UV PØP - producer
1986: Twins by In the Nursery - engineer
1986: 1000 Hours by Hula - live sound technician
1988: Threshold by Hula - engineer
1988: ITN by In the Nursery - sound engineer
1997: Praha 1 (live) by In the Nursery - sound engineer

Video game credits
1995: GT Racers - Voice Director
1995: Touché: The Adventures of the Fifth Musketeer - Sound Recording Engineer
1998: Need for Speed: Road Challenge - Voice & Casting Director
1998: Incoming - Voice Director
1998: Overblood 2 - Voice & Casting Director
1999: X: Beyond the Frontier - Voice Director
1999: 3-2-1 Smurf - Voice Director
1999: Panzer Elite - Voice Director
2000: Asterix: The Gallic War - Casting and Voice Director
2000: X-Tension - Casting and Voice Director
2001: Independence War 2: Edge of Chaos - Casting and Voice Director
2001: Fuzion Frenzy - Casting and Voice Director
2002: Diggles: The Myth of Fenris - Casting and Voice Director
2002: Drakan: The Ancients' Gates - Casting and Voice Director
2002: Stuart Little 2 - Casting and Voice Director
2002: Conflict: Desert Storm - Casting and Voice Director
2002: TimeSplitters 2 - Casting and Voice Director
2003: Outrun 2 - Casting Director
2003: The Great Escape - Casting Director
2003: Formula One 2003 - Casting Director
2003: Broken Sword: The Sleeping Dragon - Casting Director
2004: Destruction Derby Arenas - Casting and Voice Director
2004: Formula One 2004 - Casting and Voice Director
2004: Miami Vice - Casting and Voice Director
2004: Second Sight - Casting and Voice Director
2004: Powerdrome - Casting and Voice Director
2004: D-Day (video game) - Casting and Voice Director
2004: Yager - Casting and Voice Director
2004: Conflict: Vietnam - Casting and Voice Director
2005: Kameo: Elements of Power - Casting and Voice-Over Director
2005: Juiced - Casting and Voice-Over Director
2005: Spartan: Total Warrior - Casting and Voice Director
2005: WipEout Pure - Casting and Voice Director
2005: Perfect Dark Zero - Casting and Voice Director
2005: TimeSplitters: Future Perfect - Casting Director
2005: Wallace & Gromit: The Curse of the Were-Rabbit - Casting and Dialogue Director
2005: Sniper Elite - Voice Director
2005: Conflict: Global Storm - Casting and Voice Director
2006: Rogue Trooper - Casting and Voice Director
2006: Anno 1701 - Casting and Voice Director
2006: Paraworld - Casting and Voice Director
2006: ProStroke Golf: World Tour 2007 - Voice Director
2007: Formula One Championship Edition - Casting and Voice Director
2007: Clive Barker's Jericho - Casting and Voice Director
2007: Wipeout Pulse - Casting and Voice Director
2007: The Witcher - Casting and Voice Director
2008: Memento Mori - Casting and Voice Director
2008: Codename Panzers: Cold War - Casting and Voice Director
2008: Haze - Casting and Voice Director
2008: WorldShift - Casting and Voice Director
2008: Ankh 3: Battle of the God - Casting and Voice Director
2008: So Blonde - Casting and Voice Director
2009: Wallace & Gromit's Grand Adventures: 1, 2, 3, 4 - Casting and Voice-over Director, Actor of "Gabberly"
2009: Trine - Casting and Voice Director
2009: Tales of Monkey Island: Chapter 1, 2, 3, 4, 5 - Voice-Over Supervisor (UK)
2009: Divinity II: Ego Draconis - Casting Director
2009: Anno 1404 - Casting and Voice Director, Actor
2009: Ceville - Casting and Voice Director, Actor
2009: Venetica - Casting and Voice Director, Actor
2009: The Book of Unwritten Tales - Casting & Voice Director (UK)
2010: Dead Nation - Voice Director
2010: TV Superstars - Voice Director
2010: Pro Evolution Soccer 2010 - Voice Director
2011: Bunch of Heroes - Casting & Voice Director
2011: Driver: San Francisco - Casting & Voice Director
2011: SOCOM 4: U.S. Navy SEALs - Casting and Voice Director (UK)
2011: Geronimo Stilton and the Kingdom of Fantasy - Casting and Voice Director (UK)
2011: Risen 2: Dark Waters - Casting and Voice Director (UK)
2012: Trine 2 - Casting and Voice Director (UK)
2012: Deponia - Casting and Voice Director
2012: Anno 2070 - Casting and Voice Director
2012: RuneScape - Casting and Voice Director
2012: Wipeout 2048 - Casting and Voice Director
2012: Wonderbook: Book of Spells - Casting and Voice Director
2012: Chaos on Deponia - Casting and Voice Director
2013: Wonderbook: Book of Potions - Casting & Voice Director
2013: Patrician III - Casting & Voice Director
2013: Spellforce: Demons of the Past - Casting & Voice Director
2013: The Wolf Among Us - Casting and Voice Director (UK)
2013: Wonderbook: Diggs Nightcrawler - Casting & Voice Director
2013: Broken Sword: The Serpent's Curse - Casting Director
2013: Goodbye Deponia - Casting & Voice Director
2013: The Night of the Rabbit - Casting & Voice Director
2014: Transformers Universe - Casting Director
2014: Arena of Fate - Casting & Voice Director
2014: Game of Thrones (2014 video game) - Casting & Voice Director (UK)
2014: Randal's Monday - Casting & Voice Director
2015: The Book of Unwritten Tales 2 - Casting & Voice Director (UK)

See also
Outsource Media

References

Further reading

 March 2010.

External links

Mark Estdale on Discogs

British male voice actors
Living people
Year of birth missing (living people)
British casting directors
British voice directors
British audio engineers